Multilateral may refer to:

 Multilateralism
 Multilateration
 Flea flicker (American football)